The Ukrainian Hockey League is the name of the highest ice hockey league in Ukraine since the 2016–17 season, playing for the Ukrainian Hockey Championship. The league was created in June 2016 and folded in 2021.

Seasons
 2016–17 (winner: Donbas)
 2017–18 (winner: Donbas)
 2018–19 (winner: Donbas)
 2019–20 (winner: Kremenchuk)
 2020–21 (winner: Donbas)

Teams

See also
Professional Hockey League
Ukrainian Hockey Extra League

References

External links
Official Website
Hockey Game Periods

Defunct ice hockey leagues in Ukraine
2016 establishments in Ukraine
2021 disestablishments in Ukraine
Professional sports leagues in Ukraine
Sports leagues established in 2016
Sports leagues disestablished in 2021